Ferret Monogatari: Watashi no Okini Iri (Ferret Story: My Dear Ferret) is a Japan-only digital pet video game for Game Boy Color created by Culture Brain. Ferret Monogatari is a simulation style game in which you take care of a ferret.

At the start you choose one of three different coloured ferrets. The colours are randomly chosen.

The ferret is kept in the cage much of the time. You have to keep its water and food topped up, and clean its litter box. You can take your ferret out for walks or to play with. You can even play minigames. One is a race, one is putting together a picture and the other is dancing.

Despite the popularity of ferrets in other countries, especially America, this game was never released outside Japan. This may have been due to lack of popularity in Japan.

References

2000 video games
Culture Brain games
Game Boy Color-only games
Game Boy Color games
Japan-exclusive video games
Video games developed in Japan
Virtual pet video games
Single-player video games